Anders Hovden (April 6, 1860 – November 26, 1943) was a Norwegian Lutheran clergyman, hymnwriter poet and author.

Education and career
Anders  Karlsen Hovden was born at Ørsta in Møre og Romsdal, Norway. His parents were Karl Rasmussen Hovden and Johanne Andersdatter Velle. His father died when he was 16, but fellow Ørsta native Ivar Aasen helped him get an education: first the teachers' training college in Volda, then examen artium at the University of Oslo.  Hovden became cand.theol. in 1886 and then worked some years as a teacher. From 1891 he was a Lutheran minister in Lista, Son, Sande, Vanse, Krødsherad, Melhus and Østre Toten.

Hymnwriter
Hovden was the author of over 250 hymns. He debuted in the mid-1890s with a couple of poetry collections, however, it was in 1897 with his third collection, Tungalda that he received popular acclaim in wider circles. His breakthrough came in 1901 with the poetry cycle Bonden. From 1928,  he was co-editor the Norwegian hymnal, Nynorsk salmebok, which contained 23 original hymns by Anders Hovden and 16 translations from nynorsk. Most notable among his compositions was the Norwegian national hymn Fagert er landet ("Fair is the country"). He retired from his ministry in 1931.

Author
Hovden also wrote a number of books, of which his autobiography Attersyn (1926) is best known. He also wrote Per Sivle – ei livssoge (1905), the first biography of Norwegian poet and novelist, Per Sivle. Published one year after his death, it contributed to the then obscure Sivle's increasing national popularity.

Bibliography
 Sunnmøringen (1894)
 Sviv (1895)
 Heimhug (1896)
 Tungalda (1897)
 Bonden (1901)
Per Sivle – ei livssoge (1905) 
 Gate og grend (1905)
 Stormfugl (1906)
 Solhov (1907)
 Liv og lagmand (1908)
 Attersyn (1926)

Personal life
Anders Hovden was married twice and was the father of ten children. His first wife Lina Marie Devold  (1865–1895), died after only four years of marriage and the birth of two children. Two years later Hovden married with Kari Huglen (1879–1963). They had eight children together.

References

External links 
Digitized books by Hovden in the National Library of Norway

1860 births
1943 deaths
People from Ørsta
20th-century Norwegian Lutheran clergy
Norwegian autobiographers
Norwegian writers
Norwegian Lutheran hymnwriters
Norwegian songwriters
University of Oslo alumni
19th-century Norwegian Lutheran clergy